Geert Van de Walle (6 December 1964 – 26 November 1988) was a Belgian cyclist. He was Belgian amateur champion in 1985, whereupon he immediately signed a contract with the Lotto team for whom he rode in 1986 and 1987. In 1988, he switched to Isoglass-Robland.

On 26 November 1988, he died of a heart attack during a training ride with friends, ten days before his 24th birthday.

Doping
His death was noted by Willy Voet in his book Massacre à la chaîne although he acknowledged the impossibility of proving the link between these early deaths and the drugs taken while racing.

See also
 List of doping cases in cycling

References

Belgian male cyclists
Belgian track cyclists
Doping cases in cycling
1964 births
1988 deaths
People from Torhout
Sportspeople from West Flanders